The 2020 UEFA Women's Champions League Final was the final match of the 2019–20 UEFA Women's Champions League, the 19th season of Europe's premier women's club football tournament organised by UEFA, and the 11th season since it was renamed from the UEFA Women's Cup to the UEFA Women's Champions League. It was played on 30 August 2020 at the Anoeta Stadium in San Sebastián, Spain, between German club VfL Wolfsburg and French club Lyon.

The match was originally scheduled to be played at the Generali Arena in Vienna, Austria, on 24 May 2020. On 23 March 2020, UEFA announced that the final was postponed indefinitely due to the COVID-19 pandemic in Europe. On 17 June 2020, UEFA announced the match would take place in San Sebastián behind closed doors, as part of a "final-eight tournament" consisting of single-match knockout ties played in two stadiums across the Basque Country.

Lyon won the final 3–1 for their fifth consecutive and seventh overall UEFA Women's Champions League title. As Lyon also won the Division 1 Féminine and the Coupe de France féminine, they completed the treble, the club's second consecutive and fifth overall.

Teams
In the following table, finals until 2009 were in the UEFA Women's Cup era, since 2010 were in the UEFA Women's Champions League era.

Venue

The final took place at the Anoeta Stadium in San Sebastián, Gipuzkoa, Basque Country. The stadium, city, and province hosted their first ever UEFA club competition final. The greater Basque Country however had seen the San Mamés Stadium in Bilbao hosting the second leg of the 1977 UEFA Cup Final.

Original host selection

An open bidding process was launched on 22 September 2017 by UEFA to select the venues of the finals of the UEFA Champions League, UEFA Europa League, and UEFA Women's Champions League in 2020. Associations had until 31 October 2017 to express interest, and bid dossiers must be submitted by 1 March 2018.

UEFA announced on 3 November 2017 that three associations had expressed interest in hosting the 2020 UEFA Women's Champions League final.

The Generali Arena was selected by the UEFA Executive Committee during their meeting in Kyiv on 24 May 2018. This would have been the first UEFA club competition final hosted at the Generali Arena, and the first to be hosted by the city of Vienna and Austria since the 1995 UEFA Champions League Final at the Ernst-Happel-Stadion. It is the home ground of Austrian club Austria Wien. Due to UEFA regulations regarding naming rights of non-tournament sponsors, the stadium was referred to as the "Viola Park" in UEFA materials.

Relocation to San Sebastián
The 2019–20 UEFA Women's Champions League was postponed indefinitely on 17 March 2020 due to the COVID-19 pandemic in Europe. The final was officially postponed on 23 March 2020. A working group was set up by UEFA to decide the calendar of the remainder of the season, with the final decision made at the UEFA Executive Committee meeting on 17 June 2020. It was decided that the remaining matches, including the quarter-finals, semi-finals and final, would be played between 21 and 30 August at San Mamés, Bilbao and Anoeta Stadium, San Sebastián in Basque Country, Spain, as an eight-team single-match knockout tournament, with San Sebastián hosting the final.

Unlike the UEFA Champions League and Europa League, where the host venues of future finals already awarded since 2020 were all pushed back a year, the host venues of future Women's Champions League finals already awarded remained the same. The Austrian Football Association said over 12,000 tickets had already been sold for the final and they would all be refunded.

Road to the final

Note: In all results below, the score of the finalist is given first (H: home; A: away; N: neutral).

Pre-match

Ambassador
Austrian footballer Nina Burger was the original ambassador for the Vienna final.

Officials
On 28 August 2020, UEFA named Swiss official Esther Staubli as the referee for the final. Staubli had been a FIFA referee since 2006, and was previously the referee for the 2015 UEFA Women's Champions League Final. She also was a lead referee at the UEFA Women's Championship in 2013 and 2017, including the final of the latter, as well as FIFA Women's World Cup in 2015 and 2019. She was joined by assistant referees Sanja Rođak-Karšić of Croatia and Oleksandra Ardasheva of Ukraine, with the latter's compatriot Maryna Striletska serving as the reserve assistant referee. Jana Adámková of the Czech Republic was the fourth official. Spaniard José María Sánchez Martínez worked as the video assistant referee in the debut of the system in a Women's Champions League final, and was joined by his compatriot Ricardo de Burgos Bengoetxea as the assistant VAR official.

Match

Details
The "home" team (for administrative purposes) was determined by an additional draw held on 8 November 2019, 13:30 CET (after the quarter-final and semi-final draws), at the UEFA headquarters in Nyon, Switzerland.

Statistics

See also
2020 UEFA Champions League Final
2020 UEFA Europa League Final
2020 UEFA Super Cup

Notes

References

External links

2020
Final
August 2020 sports events in Spain
International club association football competitions hosted by Spain
Women's football competitions in Austria
2019–20 in Spanish football
Association football events postponed due to the COVID-19 pandemic
Sport in San Sebastián
VfL Wolfsburg (women) matches
Olympique Lyonnais Féminin matches
2019–20 in German football
2019–20 in French football